FCAT or Fcat may refer to:

Faculty of Communication, Art and Technology at Simon Fraser University in British Columbia, Canada
Federative Committee on Anatomical Terminology, a developer of international standards for human anatomical nomenclature
Festival of African Cinema (from earlier name ), held in Spain and Morocco
Florida Comprehensive Assessment Test, a standardized test formerly used on public schools in the state